In algebra, the elementary divisors of a module over a principal ideal domain (PID) occur in one form of the structure theorem for finitely generated modules over a principal ideal domain.

If  is a PID and  a finitely generated -module, then M is isomorphic to a finite sum of the form

The list of primary ideals is unique up to order (but a given ideal may be present more than once, so the list represents a multiset of primary ideals); the elements  are unique only up to associatedness, and are called the elementary divisors.  Note that in a PID, the nonzero primary ideals are powers of prime ideals, so the elementary divisors can be written as powers  of irreducible elements. The nonnegative integer  is called the free rank or Betti number of the module .

The module is determined up to isomorphism by specifying its free rank , and for class of associated irreducible elements  and each positive integer  the number of times that  occurs among the elementary divisors. The elementary divisors can be obtained from the list of invariant factors of the module by decomposing each of them as far as possible into pairwise relatively prime (non-unit) factors, which will be powers of irreducible elements. This decomposition corresponds to maximally decomposing each submodule corresponding to an invariant factor by using the Chinese remainder theorem for R. Conversely, knowing the multiset  of elementary divisors, the invariant factors can be found, starting from the final one (which is a multiple of all others), as follows.

See also
 Invariant factors

References
   Chap.11, p.182.
 Chap. III.7, p.153 of 

Module theory